Paduka Sri Sultan Ahmad Tajuddin Mukarram Shah ibni Almarhum Sultan Zainal Rashid Al-Mu'adzam Shah I (1852 – 22 June 1879) was the 24th Sultan of Kedah. He reigned from 1854 to 1879 and it was during this period that the new Balai Nobat consisting of a five-story building was built. The building was totally built of wood with zinc roofing.

Family
 Children with Wan Hajar binti Wan Ismail (died 1909)
 Tunku Aminah 
 Tunku Rokiah 
 Tunku Abdul Hamid
 Tunku Hafsah 
 Tunku Abdul Aziz 
 Tunku Asiah 
 Tunku Jiwa 
 Tunku Mahmud 

 Children with Wan Tan binti Luang Nik Abidin (died 1907)
 Tunku Zainal Rashid 
 Tunku Fatimah
 Tunku Jahara
 Tunku Abdul Jalil
 Tunku Azhari
 Tunku Zainal Abidin
 Tunku Marodziah 
 Tunku Kassim

External links
 List of Sultans of Kedah

1852 births
1879 deaths
19th-century Sultans of Kedah